Giada Gallina (born 1 December 1973 in Montebelluna) is an Italian former sprinter.

Biography
In her career she won 9 times the national championships.

National titles
4 wins in 100 metres at the Italian Athletics Championships (1993, 1994, 1995, 1997)
3 wins in 200 metres at the Italian Athletics Championships (1993, 1994, 1995) 
1 win in 60 metres at the Italian Athletics Indoor Championships (1997)
1 win in 200 metres at the Italian Athletics Indoor Championships (1994)

See also
Italian all-time lists - 100 metres

References

External links
 

1973 births
People from Montebelluna
Italian female sprinters
Living people
World Athletics Championships athletes for Italy
Mediterranean Games bronze medalists for Italy
Mediterranean Games medalists in athletics
Athletes (track and field) at the 1997 Mediterranean Games
Sportspeople from the Province of Treviso